Buddha Temple is a  summit located in the Grand Canyon, in Coconino County of northern Arizona, in the Southwestern United States. It is situated  due north of the Mather Point overlook on the canyon's South Rim, and four miles southwest of the North Rim's Bright Angel Point. Its neighbors include Manu Temple  to the northeast, Isis Temple 2.3 miles to the southwest, Zoroaster Temple 3.8 miles to the southeast, and Deva Temple, 3.5 miles to the east. Buddha Temple was named by Henry Gannett, a geographer for Clarence Dutton, in following Dutton's practice of naming features in the Grand Canyon after mythological deities, in this case Buddha. This geographical feature's name was officially adopted in 1906 by the U.S. Board on Geographic Names. The first ascent of this butte was made in 1973 by Bruce Grubbs, Chauncey Parker, and Mark Brown via the Northwest Arete. According to the Köppen climate classification system, Buddha Temple is located in a Cold semi-arid climate zone.

Geology

The summit of Buddha Temple is composed of Kaibab Limestone caprock overlaying cream-colored, cliff-forming, Permian Coconino Sandstone. The sandstone, which is the third-youngest of the strata in the Grand Canyon, was deposited 265 million years ago as sand dunes. Below the Coconino Sandstone is slope-forming, Permian Hermit Formation, which in turn overlays the Pennsylvanian-Permian Supai Group. Further down are strata of Mississippian Redwall Limestone, Cambrian Tonto Group, and finally Proterozoic Unkar Group at creek level and Granite Gorge. Precipitation runoff from Buddha Temple drains south into the Colorado River via Bright Angel Creek on its east side, and Phantom Creek on the west side.

Gallery

See also
 Geology of the Grand Canyon area

References

External links 

 Weather forecast: National Weather Service
 Buddha Temple Rock Climbing, mountainproject.com

Grand Canyon
Landforms of Coconino County, Arizona
Mountains of Arizona
Mountains of Coconino County, Arizona
North American 2000 m summits
Colorado Plateau
Grand Canyon National Park
Grand Canyon, North Rim
Sandstone formations of the United States